The Zahorna is a left tributary of the river Cracău in Romania. It flows into the Cracău near Girov.

References

Rivers of Romania
Rivers of Neamț County